NGC 6388 is a globular cluster located in the constellation Scorpius. The cluster was discovered by Scottish astronomer James Dunlop on May 13, 1826 using a  reflector telescope. Due to its moderate apparent magnitude (+6.72), a telescope is required to see it.

Gallery

References

External links 
 

6388
Globular clusters
Scorpius (constellation)